Minuartia douglasii is a species of flowering plant in the family Caryophyllaceae known by the common name Douglas' stitchwort.

It is native to the chaparral and oak woodlands in much of California, southern Oregon, and parts of Arizona.

Description
Minuartia douglasii  is an annual herb growing to a maximum height of 30 centimeters with a slender green or purplish stem which sometimes has thin branches. The threadlike, curling leaves may be up to 4 centimeters long but are under a millimeter wide.

The small flower has five white petals each a few millimeters long and smaller, ribbed sepals.

External links
Jepson Manual Treatment: Minuartia douglasii
USDA Plants Profile: Minuartia douglasii
Flora of North America
Minuartia douglasii — U.C. Photo gallery

douglasii
Flora of Arizona
Flora of California
Flora of Oregon
Flora of the Cascade Range
Flora of the Klamath Mountains
Flora of the Sierra Nevada (United States)
Natural history of the California chaparral and woodlands
Natural history of the California Coast Ranges
Natural history of the Central Valley (California)
Natural history of the Channel Islands of California
Natural history of the Peninsular Ranges
Natural history of the San Francisco Bay Area
Natural history of the Santa Monica Mountains
Natural history of the Transverse Ranges
Flora without expected TNC conservation status